Stephen Joseph Rowe (born July 1967) is a British businessman and former CEO of Marks & Spencer from April 2016 to 2022.

Early life
Stephen Joseph Rowe was born in July 1967. He is from Croydon. His father, Joe Rowe also worked for M&S, where he was head of food, and a main board director.

Career
Rowe has spent almost his entire career at Marks & Spencer, starting in Croydon working on Saturdays, aged 15.

Aged 18, Rowe joined Topshop as a trainee, and soon became a store manager, but returned to M&S, "frustrated with the lack of career development at the company".

On 7 January 2016 it was announced that Marc Bolland, who was CEO since 2010 would step down on 2 April 2016, and be replaced by Rowe, who was then head of clothing, and had previously been head of the food business.

On 2 April 2016, he became the CEO of M&S. In March 2022 it was announced that Rowe would step down as CEO being replaced by COO Stuart Machin. Rowe officially left the company in July 2022 after 37 years. He was awarded a final £1.6 million pay package.

Personal life
Rowe is a "diehard Millwall fan". He lives in Purley.

References

Living people
1967 births
People from Croydon
British retail chief executives
English businesspeople in retailing
Marks & Spencer people